is a train station in Namiyoke Sanchome, Minato-ku, Osaka, Japan.

Lines 

Osaka Loop Line

 (Station Number: C13)

Station layout

JR West
The JR West station has two side platforms serving a track each on the third floor.

Osaka Metro
The station has two side platforms serving a track each over the Osaka Loop Line.

Surrounding area
Modern Transportation Museum (closed)
Radio Osaka head office
Osaka Resort City 200 (connected by pedway)
Osaka Bay Tower (within Osaka Resort City 200)

History 
Station numbering was introduced to the JR West facilities in March 2018 with the Osaka Loop Line platforms being assigned station number JR-O15.

Adjacent stations

References 

Railway stations in Japan opened in 1961
Railway stations in Osaka Prefecture
Osaka Metro stations
Osaka Loop Line